Nentcho Christov (Bulgarian: Ненчо Христов; 17 December 1933 – 3 May 2002) was a Bulgarian cyclist.

Palmares

1955
2nd Overall Tour of Bulgaria
1st Stages 4 & 7
1956
1st Overall Tour d'Egypte
1957
1st Overall Peace Race
1st Stage 3
1st Overall Tour of Bulgaria
1st 4 stages
1958
1st 2 stages Tour of Bulgaria
1959
1st Overall Tour of Yugoslavia
1st Stage 8
6th Overall Peace Race
1962
3rd Overall Tour of Bulgaria

References

1933 births
2002 deaths
Bulgarian male cyclists
Sportspeople from Varna, Bulgaria